Christopher Elwin Fuller is an American film director, writer, producer, editor, actor and entrepreneur. His films have been compared to the early, avant-garde works of Gus Van Sant, Harmony Korine and Robert Bresson, though his peers consider him a rarity in that his films are entirely unique.

In 2006, he released Loren Cass, which he wrote, directed, produced and starred in under the name Lewis Brogan. The film is set against the backdrop of the St. Petersburg, Florida riots of 1996. The film was written at the age of 15 and filmed in 2004 at the age of 21. The movie was released theatrically and on DVD in 2009 by Kino International. The film played in competition at Dennis Hopper's CineVegas Film Festival, the Filmmakers of the Present section of the Locarno International Film Festival and the Museum of Modern Art.

Education

Fuller graduated from the Canterbury School of Florida in 2001 and attended the University of Central Florida from 2001 to 2004.

Fuller holds a black belt in Tae Kwon Do under Master Yong Jun Lee and trained in St. Petersburg, Florida under Tang Soo Do Master Michael Kinney and Mixed Martial Artist Shane Dunn.

Entrepreneurship

Fuller founded independent film company Jonesing Pictures in 2002, web development company Electric Fly in 2007 and gourmet food company The Meatman in 2008.

Awards and recognition

Fuller was nominated for an IFP Gotham Award, a Locarno Golden Leopard for Filmmakers of the Present, the Emerging Filmmaker Award at the Starz Denver Film Festival
and won the One+One Award for use of music in a feature film at Janine Bazin's Entrevues Belfort film festival in France.

Fuller was profiled as one of 100 new directors representing the future of film in Take 100: The Future of Film, 100 New Directors, a book published by Phaidon Press and curated by film festival programmers from around the world.

Fuller's films have screened at a number of major film festivals around the world including: Dennis Hopper's CineVegas, the Locarno International Film Festival, Denver Film Festival, Vienna International Film Festival, Entrevues Belfort film festival, Helsinki International Film Festival, Bradford Film Festival, Atlanta Underground Film Festival, Hudson Valley Film & Video Festival, Ljubljana International Film Festival, Gijon International Film Festival, Titanic International Filmpresence Festival, Festival Internacional de Cine Contemporaneo de la Ciudad de Mexico, Sarajevo Film Festival, Cine Esquema Novo, Indie Mostra Cinema Mundial.

The screenplay for Loren Cass has been archived by the Academy of Motion Picture Arts and Sciences as part of their Core Collection.

Filmography

References

External links
Official website

1982 births
Living people
Actors from St. Petersburg, Florida
Film directors from Florida
University of Central Florida alumni
American directors